The ZB-50 is a heavy machine gun of Czechoslovak origin. It was the only recoil-operated weapon of its type from the ZB company.

Users

References
world.guns.ru
 https://rotanazdar.cz/?p=2366&lang=cs

8 mm machine guns
Machine guns of Czechoslovakia
Heavy machine guns
Military equipment introduced in the 1930s